Artena velutina is a species of moth of the family Erebidae first described by Louis Beethoven Prout in 1919. It is found from New Guinea to the Solomons and possibly on Seram.

References

Catocalinae
Moths described in 1919
Moths of Oceania